Olga Orgonista (born 22 February 1901 in Budapest, died 20 November 1978 in Budapest) was a Hungarian pair skater. With partner Sándor Szalay, she was the 1930 and 1931 European Champion. They won two medals at the World Figure Skating Championships, a bronze in 1929 and a silver in 1931. They placed 4th at the 1932 Winter Olympics.

Results
(pairs with Sándor Szalay)

References
 
 
 Skatabase: 1932 Olympics Results

Navigation

Hungarian female pair skaters
Olympic figure skaters of Hungary
Figure skaters at the 1932 Winter Olympics
1901 births
1978 deaths
Figure skaters from Budapest
World Figure Skating Championships medalists
European Figure Skating Championships medalists